Genebrard may refer to
 Gilbert Génébrard (1535–1597), French Benedictine exegete and Orientalist
 Saint Genebrard (7th century), Irish priest who was martyred in Belgium